Dalsukh M. Pancholi (1906–1959) was an Indian film-maker, producer and distributor who is remembered for making the first Punjabi film. Considered to be a film pioneer, Pancholi's Empire Talkie Distributors based in Lahore were the biggest importer of American films in northern and western India. Pancholi's Pancholi Art Pics was also the largest film studio in Lahore at the time of the Partition of India.

Personal life 
He hailed from the village Halvad in Saurashtra, Gujarat.
His nephew Ravindra Dave was also film director and producer.

Among Lahore's filmmakers, Dalsukh Pancholi, introduced Noor Jehan as a child star in Gul Bakawali — was forced to move to Bombay in 1947 due to the partition, leaving his studio to continue for another two years. His elder brother R.M. Pancholi, started the movie business. The last film it produced was somewhat ironically titled Ghalat Fehmi.

Filmography 

 Poonji (1943) - Producer

References

External links 

 
 

1906 births
1959 deaths
Film producers from Mumbai
People from Karachi